The Order is a horror drama streaming television series created by Dennis Heaton and written by Heaton, Shelley Eriksen, Rachel Langer, Jennica Harper, Penny Gummerson, and Jason Filiatrault. The series premiered on Netflix on March 7, 2019. The series stars Jake Manley, Sarah Grey, Matt Frewer, Sam Trammell, Katharine Isabelle, and Max Martini. The first season received positive reviews upon its release.

In March 2019, it was announced that the series was renewed for a 10-episode second season that was released on June 18, 2020. In November 2020, the series was canceled after two seasons.

Premise 
'The Order' follows college student Jack Morton (Jake Manley) as he joins the Hermetic Order of the Blue Rose, a secret society that teaches and practices magic. As Jack goes deeper into the organization's history, he uncovers dark family secrets and an underground battle between werewolves and the magical dark arts.

Cast and characters

Main

 Jake Manley as Jack Morton, a freshman college student at Belgrave University and a new recruit who joins the Hermetic Order of the Blue Rose and the Knights of Saint Christopher
 Sarah Grey as Alyssa Drake, a college student and university tour guide and a medicum of the Hermetic Order of the Blue Rose
 Matt Frewer as Pete "Pops" Morton (season 1), Jack's grandfather who is obsessed with taking down Edward Coventry
 Max Martini as Edward Coventry (season 1), Jack's estranged father and the grand magus of the Hermetic Order of the Blue Rose
 Louriza Tronco as Gabrielle Dupres (season 2, recurring season 1), an acolyte in the Hermetic Order of the Blue Rose

Recurring
 Sam Trammell as Eric Clarke (season 1, guest season 2), an Ethics professor at Belgrave University
 Adam DiMarco as Randall Carpio, one of the resident advisors at Belgrave University and a member of the Knights of Saint Christopher
 Katharine Isabelle as Vera Stone, the chancellor at Belgrave University and a former temple magus and current grand magus of the Hermetic Order of the Blue Rose
 Aaron Hale as Brandon Caruthers, an acolyte in the Order
 Jedidiah Goodacre as Kyle (season 1, guest season 2), a Magistratus of the Order and Brandon's mentor
 Sean Depner as Jonas, a Magistratus of the Order and Gabrielle's mentor
 Devery Jacobs as Lilith Bathory, a student at Belgrave University and a member of the Knights of Saint Christopher
 Thomas Elms as Hamish Duke, a teaching assistant at Belgrave University and a member of the Knights of Saint Christopher
 Kayla Heller as Selena Durov, a Magistratus and one of the Order's most promising members
 Christian Michael Cooper as Maddox Coventry, Edward Coventry's son
 Françoise Yip as Elizabeth Kepler, member of the Order and Gnostic Council
 Jocelyn Hudon as Ruby Speers, a member of the Order and assistant to Dr. Hemmings.

Guest
 Sasha Roiz as Rogwan, Demon-Emperor
 Dylan Playfair as Clayton "Clay" Turner, a golem and Jack's former roommate
 Hiro Kanagawa as Detective Hayashi
 Ty Wood as Gregory Crain, a Neophyte of the Order and son of Margaret Crain
 Ajay Friese as Amir, one of the Neophytes of the Order
 Matt Visser as Weston Miller, one of the Neophytes of the Order
 Drew Tanner as Todd Shutner, one of the Neophytes of the Order
 Favour Onwuka as Drea Antonucci, one of the Neophytes of the Order
 Andres Collantes as Diego Nunez, a Magistratus of the Order
 Jewel Staite as Renee Marand (and Renee Marand's unnamed sister), a necromancer and former member of the Order
 Ian Tracey as Jurgen Sawyer
 Jodelle Ferland as Zecchia, the thief demon
 Ian Ziering as himself
 Jason Priestley as himself

Episodes

Series overview

Season 1 (2019)

Season 2 (2020)

Production

Development
On April 17, 2018, it was announced that Netflix had given the production series order for a first season consisting of ten episodes. The series was created by Dennis Heaton who will also act as writer and executive producer. Additional executive producers are set to include Shelley Eriksen (head writer), Chad Oakes, Mike Frislev and David Von Ancken. Production companies involved with the series include Nomadic Pictures Entertainment. On March 28, 2019, it was announced that the series was renewed for a second season of 10 episodes. On November 14, 2020, Netflix canceled the series after two seasons.

Casting
Alongside the initial series announcement, it was confirmed that Jake Manley, Sarah Grey, Matt Frewer, Sam Trammell, and Max Martini had been cast as series regulars.

Filming
Production for the first season began on April 18, 2018, in Vancouver, British Columbia, and concluded on July 20. Filming for the second season commenced on August 6, 2019, and ended on November 7, 2019.

The fictional Belgrave University was portrayed by various buildings of the University of British Columbia Vancouver Campus. The aerial shots of campus, however, are of Georgetown University in Washington, D.C. The Blade and Chalice bar was set in the UBC Old Auditorium building. The abandoned building housing The Order is the Riverview Hospital in Coquitlam.

Release
On February 21, 2019, the official trailer for the series was released. The first season was released on Netflix on March 7, 2019. On June 15, 2020, the official trailer for the second season was released. The second season was released on the streaming platform on June 18, 2020.

Reception

Critical response
The review aggregator website Rotten Tomatoes reported a 100% approval rating for the first season with an average rating of 7.5/10, based on 6 reviews. On Rotten Tomatoes, the second season has a 100% approval rating with an average rating of 7.68/10, based on 5 reviews.

Accolades

References

External links

 
 

2010s American college television series
2010s American drama television series
2010s American horror television series
2010s American LGBT-related drama television series
2010s American mystery television series
2010s American supernatural television series
2010s Canadian drama television series
2010s Canadian LGBT-related drama television series
2019 American television series debuts
2019 Canadian television series debuts
2020 American television series endings
2020s American college television series
2020s American drama television series
2020s American horror television series
2020s American LGBT-related drama television series
2020s American mystery television series
2020s American supernatural television series
2020s Canadian drama television series
2020s Canadian LGBT-related drama television series
American action television series
Canadian action television series
Dark fantasy television series
English-language Netflix original programming
Fictional secret societies
Murder in television
Serial drama television series
Television about werewolves
Television shows filmed in Vancouver
Television shows set in the United States
Thriller television series
Witchcraft in television